The Conservative Co-operative Movement is a political organisation promoting co-operatives and co-operative ideals within the British Conservative Party. The organisation advocated for "alternative models of capitalism", though it has faced criticism within the wider co-operative movement which has traditionally been left leaning, with a history of affiliation with the Labour Party through the Co-operative Party. The organisation appears to have become inactive.

History
The Conservative Co-operative Movement was founded in 2007 by then Conservative activist Jesse Norman. The organisation aimed to help people set up their own co-ops to tackle social problems and improve local areas. Its immediate impact on Conservative Party policy embedded his vision through which communities could own and run some of their own public services. Norman was elected to Parliament in the 2010 general election.

Activities
According to its website, the Movement promoted "alternative models of capitalism".

See also
Blue Labour

References

External links
 CCM Website

Co-operatives in the United Kingdom
Organisations associated with the Conservative Party (UK)
2007 establishments in the United Kingdom